Robert John "Rocky" Lane (12 February 1946 – 13 July 1979) was a Victorian police detective who was murdered in the line of duty. He was also an Australian rules footballer who played two senior games with Carlton in the Victorian Football League (VFL).

Lane, who hailed from Kerang, had joined the Victoria Police before he was recruited to Carlton. Former teammates remember him turning up to training in his police uniform.  He managed only the briefest of opportunities at the VFL level, coming on late in the last quarter in both of his appearances. He transferred to Williamstown, and later transferred to the country as his career progressed. Lane was captain-coach of Lake Boga and, later, Lalbert, in the Mid Murray Football League.

On 13 July 1979, while working as a detective senior constable with Victoria Police, Lane accompanied a suspect to a campsite across the state border at Kyalite, New South Wales. While searching the caravan, the suspect shot Lane twice in the head with a rifle that he had hidden, killing him instantly. Following a massive manhunt involving both Victorian and New South Wales police, the suspect was apprehended seven days later after he had dumped the police car in the river, and was sentenced to life in prison. He was released 13 years later.

Lane left behind a wife and two daughters.

Notes

External links 
 
 Bob Lane's profile at Blueseum
 On This Day - July 13, 1979 - Melbourne Murder Tours
 The Sydney Morning Herald - Jul 15, 1979 - "Rocky, the hero cop..."
 The Age - Jul 16, 1979 - "Police hunt murder couple in outback"
 The Sydney Morning Herald - Jul 19, 1979 - "Youth has vowed not to surrender police say"
 The Sydney Morning Herald - Oct 24, 1979 "Detective denies threat against murder suspect"
 The Age - Nov 6, 1979 - "Murder case"
 The Age - Oct 8, 1979 "Police urge trust fund action over widows"
 Victorian Police Blue Ribbon Foundation Honour Roll
 National Police Memorial Honour Roll

1946 births
1979 deaths
Carlton Football Club players
Williamstown Football Club players
Male murder victims
Australian police officers killed in the line of duty
Australian rules footballers from Victoria (Australia)
People murdered in New South Wales
Deaths by firearm in New South Wales